Jürgen Rosenthal is a German rock drummer.

Biography 
Rosenthal was a member of Uli Jon Roth's band Dawn Road and became a member of the Scorpions along with Roth and Francis Buchholz. He appeared on the album Fly to the Rainbow before leaving the band to do his compulsory service with the army. He later appeared in Eloy and wrote the lyrics for their 1977 album Ocean as well as for the album Dawn.

Rosenthal’s style as a drummer is unique and was a major contributor to Eloy’s most successful years (1976–1979) during which they produced "Ocean", "Dawn", "Eloy Live", and "Silent Cries and Mighty Echoes".

Discography

With Scorpions
 Fly to the Rainbow (1974)

With Eloy
 Dawn (1976)
 Ocean (1977)
 Live (1978)
 Silent Cries and Mighty Echoes (1979)

With Ego on the Rocks
 Ego on the Rocks – Acid in Wounderland (1981)

With Echo Park
 Echo Park (1988)

References 

German rock drummers
German heavy metal drummers
Male drummers
German male musicians
Scorpions (band) members
1949 births
Living people